Shatterfist is a name of two different fictional character properties: 

 Shatterfist (DC Comics)
 Shatterfist (Marvel Comics)